Gerstenberg is a German surname. Notable people with the surname include:

Alfred Gerstenberg (1893–1959), German Luftwaffe general
Alice Gerstenberg (1885–1972), American playwright, actress and activist
Detlef Gerstenberg (1957–1993), East German hammer thrower
Heinrich Wilhelm von Gerstenberg (1737–1823), German poet and critic
Kurt Gerstenberg (1886–1968), German art historian
Jamie Gerstenberg (born 2002), German association football player 
Otto Gerstenberg (1848-1935), German businessman, mathematician and art collector

German-language surnames